ADAMs (short for a disintegrin and metalloproteinase) are a family of single-pass transmembrane and secreted metalloendopeptidases. All ADAMs are characterized by a particular domain organization featuring a pro-domain, a metalloprotease, a disintegrin, a cysteine-rich, an epidermal-growth factor like and a transmembrane domain, as well as a C-terminal cytoplasmic tail. Nonetheless, not all human ADAMs have a functional protease domain, which indicates that their biological function mainly depends on protein–protein interactions. Those ADAMs which are active proteases are classified as sheddases because they cut off or shed extracellular portions of transmembrane proteins. For example, ADAM10 can cut off part of the HER2 receptor, thereby activating it. ADAM genes are found in animals, choanoflagellates, fungi and some groups of green algae. Most green algae and all land plants likely lost ADAM proteins.

ADAMs are categorized under the  enzyme group, and in the MEROPS peptidase family M12B. The terms adamalysin and MDC family (metalloproteinase-like, disintegrin-like, cysteine rich) have been used to refer to this family historically.

ADAM family members

Medicine
Therapeutic ADAM inhibitors might potentiate anti-cancer therapy.

See also
 ADAMTS (A disintegrin and metalloproteinase with thrombospondin motifs) family
 Ectodomain shedding

References

External links
 
 http://www.healthvalue.net/sheddase.html

Protein families
Single-pass transmembrane proteins
Proteases
EC 3.4.24